Saint-Gédéon-de-Beauce is a municipality in the Beauce-Sartigan Regional County Municipality in Quebec, Canada. It is part of the Chaudière-Appalaches region and the population is 2,093 as of 2021. It is named after biblical judge Gideon.

The municipality was created in February 2003 after the merging of the parish municipality of Saint-Gédéon and the municipality of Saint-Gédéon-de-Beauce. The two had split in 1950.

Saint-Gédéon-de-Beauce is a site of Canam, one of the largest steel joist factories in Canada.

Notable personalities
Novelist Jacques Poulin was born in Saint-Gédéon-de-Beauce.

Carnival king Alex Goulet was born in Saint-Gédéon-de-Beauce.

Trivia
Saint-Gédéon-de-Beauce is the only municipality whose territory straddles the Chaudière River that does not have a bridge across it.

References

Commission de toponymie du Québec
Ministère des Affaires municipales, des Régions et de l'Occupation du territoire

Municipalities in Quebec
Incorporated places in Chaudière-Appalaches